Oligostigmoides cuernavacale is a moth in the family Crambidae. It was described by William Harry Lange in 1956. It is found in Mexico.

References

Acentropinae
Moths described in 1956